The Rivers of America is the artificial river found in the Frontierland areas of Disneyland-style Disney theme parks around the world. The first river was built in Disneyland when the park opened in 1955. It surrounds Tom Sawyer Island, which can be reached by rafts traveling from the Frontierland mainland. Additionally, there are other water-based vehicles which are found on the river. The sights along the Rivers include a Native American tribe, a burning cabin (though the cabin at Disneyland has been removed), and various audio-animatronic wildlife.

As other magic kingdom-style parks were built, similar versions were included.

At Walt Disney World the Rivers of America is similar to its California counterpart
At Disneyland Paris the Rivers of the Far West is home to Big Thunder Mountain
At Hong Kong Disneyland, there is no Frontierland, so the Imagineers merged the Rivers of America with the classic Adventureland Jungle Cruise attraction. Jungle river rafts now travel around the Rivers of Adventure, encountering similar situations as in the Jungle Cruise attraction, but on a much more open river and exposed to the elements of Adventureland. In the middle of the Rivers sits Tarzan's Treehouse, which can be reached by River Rafts.

Several steamboat and ship replicas sail the many Rivers. 
 Disneyland - the Mark Twain Riverboat and the Sailing Ship Columbia
 Walt Disney World - the Liberty Belle Riverboat
 Tokyo Disneyland - the Mark Twain Riverboat
 Disneyland Paris - the Molly Brown Riverboat (sidewheeler) and the Mark Twain Riverboat (sternwheeler)

Disneyland 
At Disneyland Park in Anaheim, the river passes through Frontierland, New Orleans Square and Critter Country.

History 

The Rivers of America existed since Disneyland opened on July 17, 1955, opening with the Mark Twain Riverboat. However, the island that the river surrounds was left almost completely bare. The Mike Fink Keel Boats opened in December of that year.

In 1956, the river saw the opening of the Indian War Canoes (now Davy Crockett Explorer Canoes), as well as the Tom Sawyer Island area on the center island, newly accessible by raft.

The Sailing Ship Columbia was introduced in 1958.

The nighttime show Fantasmic! began showing on the river May 13, 1992.

The Mike Fink Keel Boats closed in 1997.

In September 2015, Disneyland Resort announced that the Rivers of America and its attractions would temporarily close starting January 11, 2016, to prepare for Star Wars: Galaxy's Edge. An official Disneyland Twitter account confirmed that the Rivers of America would have a new route when it reopened from construction. The Rivers of America and its attractions reopened in July 2017.

Ecology 
The Rivers of America is home to many natural wildlife not intentionally put by Disney. Ducks flying in from local parks, nature reserves and wetlands have brought many freshwater living creatures via their eggs getting stuck on the bottom of their feet and dislodging during landing in the river. Currently the river has many aquatic inhabitants some of them being freshwater carp, Koi fish, occasionally freshwater salmon, catfish, and Red-Eared Slider turtles. Since the Rivers of America is not filtered or chlorinated in any way, Disney has placed mosquitofish in the waterways -which also connect to the Jungle Cruise, the Adventurland-Frontierland-Castle moat, Big Thunder Pond, Storybookland Canal, and the Fantasyland pond which formerly hosted the Fantasyland motorboat cruise- all to battle mosquito larvae from growing. A wildlife food chain had set itself up in the rivers, the mosquito fish eat algae and insect larvae, they are then preyed upon by other river fish and turtles, deceased fish are eaten by catfish, and the food chain continues.

Upkeep 
All the waterways in Disneyland are interconnected so that they may go through a natural process of filtration and de-stagnation much like a lake or pond can do. By connecting the waterways, the rivers and moats could act as a single body of water and prevent fouling like an abandoned swimming pool. To this day all the dark green waters of Disneyland are connected via underground connecting tubes, also allowing for aquatic life to pass through. Upon opening of the Rivers of America, the water was a brown color due to the soil and mostly natural clay that kept the water from sinking (the first fill-the-river day failed as the water was absorbed by the sandy Anaheim substrate). When the rivers and moats were eventually embanked by concrete, they didn't want the water to be clear or it would reveal pipes, guidance tracks, and other hidden functions, so today the rivers are dyed green with chalk, since the chalk doesn't settle and it doesn't bother the wildlife. Also included since opening day, a dry dock area for refurbishments.

The Rivers of America and the waterways of Disneyland remain at level even during the hot summer when the water evaporates, because most remaining original park gutters drain into the waterways. On rainy days, the gutters of the parks that are still connected to the Rivers of America allow for the river to rise to its normal level. Over-topping of concrete embankments happens frequently but has never posed a major issue.

Originally, the Rivers of America required draining every 5 years in order to clean up sunken debris, scrub algae forests away, and maintain upkeep of the Mark Twain and Columbia Sailing ship guidance track. In January 2010 when the river was drained after 7 years of continual operation, items found in the river were numbered in hundreds of cellphones, pagers, walkie talkies, a computer tower, a prosthetic leg and half of a Davy Crockett Explorer canoe. To prevent the Jungle Cruise and other waters from draining as well, the underground tubes were plugged with air bladders. Any fish and wildlife found in the river were placed (alive) back into the remaining waters of the park. Any Koi fish found, were donated along with the Koi once kept at the Disneyland Hotel, to the Huntington Library. When the Rivers of America were refilled, the wildlife migrated back into the river. With its most recent refurbishment and the addition of a specialized pumping and cleaning system that would not disrupt the aquatic life, the Rivers of America would not need to be drained for another 20 years.

Attractions

Current Attractions 
 Mark Twain Riverboat
 Sailing Ship Columbia
 Davy Crockett Explorer Canoes
 Pirate's Lair on Tom Sawyer Island

Former Attractions 
 Mike Fink Keel Boats

Entertainment

Current Entertainment 
 Fantasmic!
 Wondrous Journeys

Seasonal 
 Wondrous Journeys
 Halloween Screams
 Believe... In Holiday Magic
 Disney's Celebrate America

Former Entertainment 
 Remember... Dreams Come True
 Together Forever
 Mickey's Mix Magic
 Disneyland Forever

Other uses of the river

Fantasmic!, opened on May 13, 1992, takes place on the River, as well as Tom Sawyer Island.

In 2003, the motion picture Pirates of the Caribbean: The Curse of the Black Pearl had its world premiere on the Rivers at Disneyland, with hundreds of celebrities and movie stars viewing the film on a purpose-built  projection screen.

In 2006, the film's sequel, Pirates of the Caribbean: Dead Man's Chest, premiered on June 24 on the Rivers as well, two days before the Pirates of the Caribbean attraction re-opened opposite the Rivers in New Orleans Square after a lengthy refurbishment. For the 2007 premiere of the third installment of the trilogy, the Rivers of America was once again home to the gala for Pirates of the Caribbean: At World's End.

The world premiere of Pirates of the Caribbean: On Stranger Tides was on May 7, 2011, at a premium ticket screening at Disneyland in Anaheim, California, home of the original Pirates of the Caribbean ride that inspired the film series. Many of the film's stars were in attendance. The screening took place on the river with a temporary outdoor theater constructed along with a massive movie screen and sound system installed on the stage on Tom Sawyer's Island. The Sailing Ship Columbia was decorated like 'The Black Pearl' from the movie franchise and moved forward at a close proximity to the theater seating.

Since the opening of the Davy Crockett Explorer canoes, Disneyland Cast Members have hosted an annual event called "The Canoe Races" which takes place before park opening. Cast Members enter the race with a team they form and race in a canoe. The race is watched from the Frontierland/New Orleans Square area by many Cast Members who cheer on their friends and teammates. (Contrary to popular belief, the canoes are free floating and have no form of propulsion other than the man-power of paddling oars. Cast Members often joke about the difficulties of operating a canoe full of lazy guests who think the boat is motorized).

Deaths

Over time instances have happened where on two separate occasions, people have drowned while trying to swim to shore.

On June 20, 1973, an 18-year-old man drowned while attempting to swim across the "Rivers of America". He and his 10-year-old brother stayed on Tom Sawyer's Island past closing time by hiding in an area that is off-limits to guests. When they wanted to leave the island, they decided to swim across the river even though the younger brother did not know how to swim. The victim attempted to carry his younger brother on his back and drowned halfway across. His body was found the next morning. The younger brother was able to stay afloat by "dog paddling" until a ride operator rescued him.
On June 4, 1983, an 18-year-old man drowned in the Rivers of America while trying to pilot a rubber emergency boat from Tom Sawyer's Island that he and a friend had stolen from a "cast members only" area of the island.

Magic Kingdom 
At Magic Kingdom Park in Walt Disney World, Orlando, the river passes through Frontierland and Liberty Square. The Magic Kingdom river also hosts a cast member canoe race, similar to Disneyland's, called Canoe Races of the World (C.R.O.W.).

History

Attractions

Current Attractions 
 Liberty Belle Riverboat
 Tom Sawyer Island

Former Attractions 
 Davy Crockett Explorer Canoes
 Mike Fink Keel Boats

Tokyo Disneyland 
At Tokyo Disneyland, the river passes through Westernland and Critter Country.

History

Attractions 
 Mark Twain Riverboat
 Beaver Brothers Explorer Canoes
 Tom Sawyer Island

Disneyland Paris 
At Disneyland Paris the river is known as the Rivers of the Far West, and it exists in Frontierland. Uniquely at this park, Big Thunder Mountain takes the place of Tom Sawyer Island.

History

Attractions

Current Attractions 
 Big Thunder Mountain
 Thunder Mesa Riverboat Landing

Former Attractions 
 Indian Canoes
 River Rogue Keel Boats (Unknown if closed)

References

Walt Disney Parks and Resorts attractions
Disneyland
Magic Kingdom
Tokyo Disneyland
Disneyland Park (Paris)
Hong Kong Disneyland
Audio-Animatronic attractions
1955 establishments in California